Sheykh Hoseynlu (also Romanized as Sheykh Ḩoseynlū; also known as Shaikh Husain, Sheykh Ḩasanlū, Sheykh Ḩoseyn, and Shikhuseyn) is a village in Minjavan-e Gharbi Rural District, Minjavan District, Khoda Afarin County, East Azerbaijan Province, Iran. At the 2006 census, its population was 131, in 34 families.

References 

Populated places in Khoda Afarin County